This is a list of people who have served as Custos Rotulorum of Pembrokeshire.

 John Vaughan bef. 1544 – bef. 1558
 Thomas Cathern bef. 1558 – bef. 1562
 Sir John Perrot bef. 1562–1592
 Robert Devereux, 2nd Earl of Essex bef. 1594–1601
 Sir James Perrot 1601 – aft. 1608
 Sir William Wogan bef. 1621–1625
 William Herbert, 3rd Earl of Pembroke 1625–1630
 Philip Herbert, 4th Earl of Pembroke 1630–1643
 Richard Vaughan, 2nd Earl of Carbery 1643–1646
 Interregnum
 Philip Herbert, 5th Earl of Pembroke 1660–1669
 William Herbert, 6th Earl of Pembroke 1670–1674
 Philip Herbert, 7th Earl of Pembroke 1674–1683
 Thomas Herbert, 8th Earl of Pembroke 1683–1715
 Sir Arthur Owen, 3rd Baronet 1715–1753
For later custodes rotulorum, see Lord Lieutenant of Pembrokeshire.

References
Institute of Historical Research - Custodes Rotulorum 1544-1646
Institute of Historical Research - Custodes Rotulorum 1660-1828

Pembrokeshire